Rainbow Hills is an unincorporated community in Kane County, Illinois, United States. It is located near the intersection of Peck Road and Illinois Route 64, and is also near the Disc Golf Course in St Charles.

References

Unincorporated communities in Kane County, Illinois
Unincorporated communities in Illinois